The China Railways MT1 class steam locomotive was a class of 4-8-2 steam locomotives for goods trains operated by the China Railway. They were originally built for the South Manchuria Railway (Mantetsu) in Japan in 1936. The "Mate" name came from the American naming system for steam locomotives, under which locomotives with 4-8-2 wheel arrangement were called "Mountain".

History

As the development of Manchukuo continued and the population of cities like Xinjing and Harbin grew, it became necessary to transport increasing quantities of fresh foods to the north. To fill this need, express fish trains were planned, for which a goods locomotive capable of high speed operation was required. The result of this requirement was the Matei class superheated tender locomotive built in 1936. They were the largest Mantetsu locomotives in terms of length and weight, and were equipped with a Schmidt type E superheater, a feedwater heater, and an automatic stoker. Originally planned with a 4-6-2 wheel arrangement and intended for high-speed transport of perishable foods to the north, but the need to pull regular goods trains southbound led to the use of a 4-8-2 arrangement for traction and larger wheel diameter for increased speed. A total of seven were built by Kawasaki and Hitachi in 1936.

Postwar
At the end of the Pacific War, all seven were assigned to the Sujiatun locomotive depot of the Fengtian Railway Bureau, and all were taken over by the Republic of China Railway. Following the establishment of the People's Republic and the subsequent creation of the current China Railway, they became class ㄇㄉ一 (MT1) in 1951, becoming class MT1 (written in Pinyin instead of Zhuyin) in 1959, and numbered 1–7. Numbers 5 and 6 were in service at the Hegang mine in 1985.

References

4-8-2 locomotives
Kawasaki locomotives
Hitachi locomotives
Railway locomotives introduced in 1936
Steam locomotives of China
Standard gauge locomotives of China
Rolling stock of Manchukuo
Freight locomotives